Signal Mountain Wilderness is a protected wilderness area centered around its namesake Signal Mountain, rising  to a summit at  in the Gila Bend Mountains in the U.S. state of Arizona. Established in 1990 under the Arizona Desert Wilderness Act, the area is managed by the Bureau of Land Management. The desert wilderness is made up of steep canyons, winding arroyos, and volcanic peaks within a Sonoran Desert ecosystem.

Adjacent to the Woolsey Peak Wilderness to the southeast, divided by a rugged jeep road, the area contains typical Sonoran flora: palo verde, creosote bush, saguaro cactus, and bursage. There is an abundance of wildlife including mule deer, desert bighorn sheep, and javelina as well as bobcats and mountain lions.

See also
 List of Arizona Wilderness Areas
 List of U.S. Wilderness Areas

References

IUCN Category Ib
Wilderness areas of Arizona
Protected areas of Maricopa County, Arizona
Protected areas established in 1990
1990 establishments in Arizona